Chris Evert was the defending champion but did not compete that year.

Conchita Martínez beat Gabriela Sabatini in the final by a score of 6–3, 6–2. With the victory, Conchita avenged a second round loss she suffered against Sabatini earlier that year at the Australian Open. It was also Conchita's second title of the season, and the third of her career. The match was Sabatini's third final of the year, and marked the first time she had been beaten by Conchita.

Seeds
A champion seed is indicated in bold text while text in italics indicates the round in which that seed was eliminated.

  Gabriela Sabatini (final)
  Natasha Zvereva (second round)
  Katerina Maleeva (first round)
  Arantxa Sánchez (semifinals)
  Larisa Savchenko (first round)
  Sandra Cecchini (quarterfinals)
  Susan Sloane (second round)
  Conchita Martínez (champion)

Draw

External links
 1989 Eckerd Open Draw

1989 WTA Tour
1989 in sports in Florida
1989 in American tennis